The Wild Goose: A Collection of Ocean Waifs was a hand-written newspaper created in late 1867 by Fenian prisoners aboard Hougoumont, the last ship to transport convicts to Australia.

Seven issues of the newspaper were produced, and each issue was carefully laid out and decorated by hand. Only one copy of each issue was made, which was then read to the convicts aloud. The aim was to provide entertainment and encouragement aboard the ship during its long and arduous voyage to Fremantle. The title refers to the Wild Geese: the Irish soldiers who had left to serve in continental European armies since the 16th century.

The major contributors were John Flood, John Boyle O'Reilly and John Sarsfield Casey. The documents provide insight into life aboard ship. The documents contain songs, stories, articles, advice, poems, and even comedy. In addition to the diaries of Denis Cashman and the journals of Casey and Thomas McCarthy Fennell, the journey of Hougoumont was well recorded.

One passage describes Australia and its history with more than a little sarcasm:

O'Reilly penned several poems for the paper, including The Flying Dutchman and The Old School Clock.

All seven issues survive, and were passed by Flood's granddaughter to the Mitchell Library in 1967. The papers are bound into one book and are now part of the State Library of New South Wales collection.

On 9 September 2005, a memorial was unveiled at Rockingham beach to commemorate the Catalpa rescue. The memorial is a large statue of six wild geese.

See also
Flight of the Wild Geese

Notes

Further reading 

Laubenstein, William J. The emerald whaler  London : Deutsch, 1961.
Stevens, Peter F. – The Voyage of the Catalpa
 Journal of the Cork Historical and Archaeological Society, 1969, volume LXXIV

Wild Goose
Wild Goose
Wild Goose
1867 establishments in Australia
Publications disestablished in 1867